Arista was the New York City public school variant name for chapters of the National Honor Society (NHS). Arista began in the early 20th century and remained independent and active through the 1980s when nearly all schools converted into NHS chapters, avoiding confusion on college applications.

The common insignia of the NYC 'Arista' chapters was an oval lapel pin, worn vertically (approx. 1/2 inch tall and 1/4 inch wide) and divided diagonally into the colors of the particular school.

Clive Davis, a member of Arista during his time at Erasmus Hall High School, repurposed the name as founder of Arista Records in 1974.

As of 2018, there are 'Arista' chapters at several U.S. high schools. At least one chapter, upon discovering that they had been following the original Arista constitution and could not practically come into compliance with the NHS charter, chose to drop membership in the National Honor Society and continue as an independent Arista chapter.

References

High school honor societies